The military ranks of Afghanistan were the military insignia used by militaries of Afghanistan throughout history.

Current ranks

Islamic Emirate of Afghanistan
Following the return of the Taliban into power, the Islamic Emirate Armed Forces continue to use the rank insignia of the Islamic Republic Armed Forces.
Commissioned officer ranks
The rank insignia of commissioned officers.

Other ranks
The rank insignia of non-commissioned officers and enlisted personnel.

Historic ranks

Republic of Afghanistan (1987–1992)
Commissioned officer ranks
The rank insignia of commissioned officers.

Other ranks
The rank insignia of non-commissioned officers and enlisted personnel.

Islamic Republic of Afghanistan (2004–2021)
Commissioned officer ranks
The rank insignia of commissioned officers.

Other ranks
The rank insignia of non-commissioned officers and enlisted personnel.

References

External links
 
 

Afghanistan
Military of Afghanistan